Pararge adrastoides is a butterfly of the family Nymphalidae. It is found south-eastern Transcaucasia, Azerbaijan and northern Iran. The larvae have been recorded on Festuca species.

Resources 
 animaldiversity.ummz.umich.edu
 wnsstamps.ch
 fauna.me/species
 zipcodezoo.com/Animals/P/Pararge_adrastoides

Elymniini
Butterflies of Asia
Butterflies described in 1870